Brachysomus echinatus  is a species of weevil native to Europe.

References

External links
Images representing Brachysomus at BOLD

Curculionidae
Beetles described in 1785
Beetles of Europe